Nik Rabinowitz is a South African comedian, actor and author, who has made guest appearances on several comedy shows, including the British panel show Mock the Week. He also appeared in the 2012 film Material. He currently resides in Cape Town. He is also a presenter on SABC, where he has presented Coca-Cola Megamillions Gameshow. He currently presents The Week that Wasn't. His book South Africa: Long Walk to a Free Ride was launched in early 2012.

Early life 
Rabinowitz was born into a Jewish family in Constantia, Cape Town. He graduated from University of Cape Town. He learned to speak Xhosa as a child.

Personal life 
Nik is married to Debbie Rabinowitz who is a General Practitioner, and has 3 children. <ref

References

External links
 
 
 About Nik Rabinowitz
 Rabinowitz performing live
 Interview

Male actors from Cape Town
South African Jews
South African male comedians
Living people
Year of birth missing (living people)
21st-century comedians
21st-century South African male actors
University of Cape Town alumni